Thanatpin is a town in Thanatpin Township, Bago District, Bago Region in Myanmar. It is the administrative seat of Thanatpin Township.

Notes

External links
"Thanatpin Map — Satellite Images of Thanatpin" Maplandia

Township capitals of Myanmar
Populated places in Bago Region